UBH Denton (University Behavioral Health of Denton) is an acute care, private psychiatric hospital located in Denton, Texas. The hospital  was purchased by Universal Health Services, Inc. (UHS) in 2012 from Ascend Healthcare.

UBH Denton provides both inpatient and outpatient services, as well as specialty programs for patients with mental disorders, women's mental health and chemical dependency, pain management, and military-related mental disorders. Additionally, UBH Denton is one of the limited private psychiatric hospitals in the North Texas area that offers inpatient and outpatient services to male & female adolescents (ages 13–17) The hospital is considered a freestanding psychiatric hospital, and does not offer typical services a medical or surgical hospital would provide.

UBH Denton has mixed reviews posted on websites and search engine results. The hospital has been the subject of various lawsuits; alleging wrongful death, mistreatment abuse, and other violations. Considering the nature of media covering mental health—combined with the nature of psychiatric care and mental health disorders; the self-perceived quality of care a patient receives can be difficult to reliably report and assess.

References

External links
 Official Website

Hospital buildings completed in 2005
Psychiatric hospitals in Texas